Carbadox is a veterinary drug that combats infection in swine, particularly swine dysentery.

Indications
Carbadox is indicated for control of swine dysentery (vibrionic dysentery, bloody scours, or hemorrhagic dysentery); control of bacterial swine enteritis (salmonellosis or necrotic enteritis caused by Salmonella enterica); aid in the prevention of migration and establishment of large roundworm (Ascaris suum) infections; aid in the prevention of establishment of nodular worm (Oesophagostomum) infections.

Safety
In animal models, carbadox has been shown to be carcinogenic and to induce birth defects.  The Food and Drug Administration's Center for Veterinary Medicine has questioned the safety in light of its possible carcinogenicity.

Regulation

Carbadox is approved in the United States only for use in swine and may not be used within 42 days of slaughter or used in pregnant animals. In 2016, the United States Food and Drug Administration moved to ban its use in pork, citing a potential cancer risk to humans.  However, as of August 2018, FDA had indefinitely stayed its withdrawal of approval and carbadox remains available. 

In 2004, carbadox was banned by the Canadian government as a livestock feed additive and for human consumption. The European Union also forbids the use of carbadox at any level.   Australia forbids the use of carbadox in food producing animals.

References

Antimicrobials
Antiparasitic agents
IARC Group 1 carcinogens
Quinoxalines
Amine oxides
Hydrazones
Veterinary drugs